Aquimarina macrocephali  is a Gram-negative, strictly aerobic and rod-shaped bacterium from the genus of Aquimarina which has been isolated from sediments near a whale carcasses near Kagoshima on Japan.

References

External links
Type strain of Aquimarina macrocephali at BacDive -  the Bacterial Diversity Metadatabase

Flavobacteria
Bacteria described in 2010